Tim Trigueiro (born January 16, 1967) is a former professional tennis player from the United States.

Biography
Trigueiro grew up in Santa Barbara, California and is the son of Jack Trigueiro, a sports coach at Santa Barbara High School.

He was the boys' singles champion at the 1985 US Open, then played college tennis for the UCLA Bruins.

On the professional tour, he reached a best singles ranking of 364 in the world. He was a doubles semi-finalist at the 1990 OTB International Open, an ATP Tour tournament held in Schenectady, where he partnered with Czechoslovakia's Martin Střelba.

Junior Grand Slam finals

Singles: 1 (1 title)

References

External links
 
 

1967 births
Living people
American male tennis players
US Open (tennis) junior champions
UCLA Bruins men's tennis players
Tennis people from California
Sportspeople from Santa Barbara, California
Grand Slam (tennis) champions in boys' singles